Siemensstadt is a locality (Ortsteil) of Berlin in the district (Bezirk) of Spandau.

History
The locality emerged when the company Siemens & Halske (S & H), one of the predecessors of today's Siemens, bought land in the area, in order to expand production of S & H and their subsidiary Siemens-Schuckertwerke (SSW) as well. On the initiative of Georg Wilhelm von Siemens S & H started to build new factories in 1899. Soon also residential buildings were erected. The locality was incorporated into Berlin on 1 October 1920 by the Greater Berlin Act.

Geography
Siemensstadt is situated in the eastern side of Spandau district. It borders with Spandau (locality), Haselhorst, Tegel (in Reinickendorf), Charlottenburg-Nord and Westend (both in Charlottenburg-Wilmersdorf). The Großsiedlung Siemensstadt is situated close to Siemensstadt but in Charlottenburg-Nord.

Transport
Siemensstadt is served by the Berliner U-Bahn line U7 at the stations of Paulsternstrasse, Rohrdamm and Siemensdamm.

Images

See also
 Großsiedlung Siemensstadt

References

External links

 Siemensstadt page on www.berlin.de

Localities of Berlin

Siemens
1913 establishments in Germany